The 1988–89 Missouri Tigers men's basketball team represented the University of Missouri as a member of the Big Eight Conference during the 1988–89 NCAA men's basketball season. Led by head coach Norm Stewart, the Tigers finished second in the Big Eight regular season standings, won the Big Eight conference tournament, and were the No. 3 seed in the Midwest region of the NCAA tournament. The Tigers advanced to the Sweet Sixteen and finished with an overall record of 29–8 (10–4 Big Eight).

Roster

Schedule and results

 
|-
!colspan=9| Regular season

|-
!colspan=9| Big Eight Conference tournament

|-
!colspan=9| NCAA tournament

Rankings

^Coaches did not release a Week 1 poll.

References

Missouri
Missouri
Missouri Tigers men's basketball seasons